Krzysztof Pieczyński (born 27 March 1957) is a Polish actor. He appeared in more than fifty films since 1979.

Filmography

References

External links 

1957 births
Living people
Polish male film actors
Polish male television actors
Polish male stage actors
People from Opole